The 1952 Missouri lieutenant gubernatorial election was held on November 4, 1952. Democratic incumbent James T. Blair Jr. defeated Republican nominee Henry Arthur with 53.16% of the vote.

Primary elections
Primary elections were held on August 5, 1952.

Democratic primary

Candidates
James T. Blair Jr., incumbent Lieutenant Governor
William J. Becker

Results

Republican primary

Candidates
Henry Arthur
Harry E. Kemp
Thomas G. Woolsey

Results

General election

Candidates
Major party candidates
James T. Blair Jr., Democratic
Henry Arthur, Republican

Other candidates
Sol Derman, Progressive
E. F. Moore, Socialist
O. M. Tanner, Christian Nationalist
R. H. Shadwell, Socialist Labor

Results

References

1952
Gubernatorial
Missouri